Asota australis is a moth of the family Erebidae first described by Jean Baptiste Boisduval in 1832. It is found in Australia, Indonesia and Papua New Guinea.

The wingspan is about 50 mm.

Subspecies
Asota australis assimilis (Northern Territory, Queensland)
Asota australis australis (Indonesia, Papua New Guinea)
Asota australis sinuosa (Indonesia)

References

Asota (moth)
Moths of Oceania
Moths of Indonesia
Moths described in 1832